Statistics of Division 2 in the 1945–46 season.

Overview
It was contested by 28 teams, and Nancy and Montpellier won the championship.

League tables

Group North

Group South

References
France - List of final tables (RSSSF)

French
2
Ligue 2 seasons